Podgora is a small town in the Split-Dalmatia County of Croatia. It is located on the Adriatic coastline of Dalmatia, 65 km south of Split and 135 km north of Dubrovnik. The town has a population of 1,268 (2011) while the municipality of Podgora (which includes several smaller towns) has a population of 2,518 (2011).

Podgora has a largely tourism-based economy. With its five hotels, it has four times as many beds as inhabitants.

History
In pashaluk censuses in 1624 and 1690, 80 and 125 houses respectively were recorded. An 1828 status animarum recorded 955 inhabitants living in 194 family households.

Podgora is the birthplace of Don Mihovil Pavlinović, a priest, politician and writer, best known as the first person to speak Croatian in the Dalmatian parliament, seeking the unification of Dalmatia and Croatia.

Organized tourism started in Podgora in 1922, when the first hotel "Praha" was built. During World War II, on September 10, 1942, the Yugoslav Partisans formed the Partisan Navy in Podgora. In 1962 Josip Broz Tito unveiled an impressive monument on a small hill above the port of Podgora, The wings of a seagull, in remembrance of World War II events.

Gallery

References

Bibliography
 

Municipalities of Croatia
Populated coastal places in Croatia
Populated places in Split-Dalmatia County